Motilal Nehru (6 May 1861 – 6 February 1931) was an Indian lawyer, activist and politician belonging to the Indian National Congress. He also served as the Congress President twice, 1919–1920 and 1928–1929. He was a patriarch of the Nehru-Gandhi family and the father of Jawaharlal Nehru, the first Prime Minister of India.

Early life and education
Motilal Nehru was born on 6 May 1861, the posthumous son of Gangadhar Nehru and his wife Indrani. The Nehru family had been settled for several generations in Delhi, and Gangadhar Nehru was a kotwal in that city. During India's independence struggle of 1857, Gangadhar left Delhi with his family and moved to Agra, where some of his relatives lived. By some accounts, the Nehru family home in Delhi had been looted and burnt down during the Mutiny. In Agra, Gangadhar quickly arranged the weddings of his two daughters, Patrani and Maharani, into Kashmiri Brahmin families. He died on 4 February 1861 and his youngest child, Motilal, was born three months later.

At this time, Motilal's two older brothers, Bansidhar Nehru (b. 1842) and Nandlal Nehru (b. 1845), were nineteen and sixteen years old respectively. Since the family had lost nearly all its assets in the upheaval of 1857, Jeorani turned to her brother, Amarnath Zutshi of Bazaar Sitaram in old Delhi, for support until her sons could begin earning. She did receive some support from him, but all of Delhi had suffered hugely during the recent mutiny and assistance could not be open-ended. Within a couple of years, Nandlal secured a job as a clerk in the court of a Raja of Khetri and began supporting his mother and brother.

Thus, Motilal came to spend his childhood in Khetri, second largest thikana (feudal estate) within the princely state of Jaipur, now in Rajasthan. His elder brother, Nandlal gained the favour of Raja Fateh Singh of Khetri, who was the same age as him, and rose to the position of Diwan (Chief Minister; effectively the manager) of the vast feudal estate. In 1870, Fateh Singh died childless and was succeeded by a distant cousin, who had little use for his predecessor's confidants. Nandlal left Khetri for Agra and found that his prior career at Khetri equipped him to advise litigants regarding their legal suits. Once he realised this, he exhibited his industry and resilience again by studying for and passing the necessary examinations so that he could practice law in the British colonial courts. He then began practising law at the provincial High Court at Agra. Subsequently, the High Court shifted base to Allahabad, and the family (including Motilal) moved to that city.

Career
Motilal passed the bar examination in 1883 and began practicing law at Kanpur. Three years later, he moved to Allahabad to join the lucrative practice already established by his brother Nandlal. The following year, in April 1887, his brother died at the age of forty-two, leaving behind five sons and two daughters. Thus Motilal at the age of 25 became sole bread-earner of the extended Nehru family.

Many of Motilal's suits were civil cases concerning large land-owning families. He soon made a name for himself in the civil society of Allahabad. With the success of his practice, in 1900, he bought a large family home in the Civil Lines area of the city, rebuilt it and named it Anand Bhavan (lit. Joy house). In 1909, he reached the pinnacle of his legal career by gaining the approval to appear in the Privy Council of Great Britain. His frequent visits to Europe angered the Kashmiri Brahmin community as he refused to perform the traditional "prayashchit", or reformation ceremony, after crossing the ocean (according to Strict Hinduism, one lost one's caste after crossing the ocean, and was required to perform certain penance rites to regain caste). He was the first chairman of the board of directors of The Leader, a leading daily published from Allahabad.

On 5 February 1919 he launched a new daily paper, The Independent, as a counterpoint to 'The Leader', which was much too liberal for Motilal's standard and articulate thought in 1919.

He started on the path to become wealthy among the few leaders of the Indian National Congress. Under the influence of Mahatma Gandhi in 1918, Nehru became one of the first to transform his life to exclude western clothes and material goods, adopting a more native Indian lifestyle.

To meet the expenses of his large family and large family homes (he built Swaraj Bhavan later), Nehru had to occasionally return to his practice of law. Swaraj Bhawan originally belonged to Sir Syed Ahmad Khan, the 19th century Muslim leader and educationist. At the house-warming party, Sir William Moor hoped that this large palatial home in Civil Lines of Allahabad would become the cement holding together the British Empire in India. Paradoxically, the house was bought by Motilal Nehru in 1900, and went on to become a cradle to the Indian Freedom Struggle which was to destroy British rule in India.

Political career
Motilal Nehru twice served as President of the Congress Party, once in Amritsar (1919) and the second time in Calcutta (1928). The Jallianwala Bagh massacre of 1919 left a deep impression on him where it has been reported that he wrote in its aftermath: "My blood is boiling". In December that year, he was elected to preside over the Amritsar Congress. Motilal was in the centre of the gathering storm which pulled down many familiar landmarks during the following year. He was the only front rank leader to lend his support to non-co-operation at the special Congress at Calcutta in September 1920. The Calcutta Congress (December 1928) over which Motilal presided was the scene of a head-on clash between those who were prepared to accept Dominion Status and those who would have nothing short of complete independence. A split was averted by a proposal by Mahatma Gandhi, according to which if Britain did not concede Dominion Status within a year, the Congress was to demand complete independence and to fight for it, if necessary, by launching civil disobedience. He was arrested during the Non-Cooperation Movement. Although initially close to Gandhi, he openly criticised Gandhi's suspension of civil resistance in 1922 due to the murder of policemen by a riotous mob in Chauri Chaura in Uttar Pradesh.

Motilal later joined the Swaraj Party, which sought to enter the British-sponsored councils. Motilal had been elected to the United Provinces Legislative Council where he staged the first walk-out in protest of the rejection of a resolution he had moved.  In 1923, Nehru was elected to the new Central Legislative Assembly of British India in New Delhi and became leader of the Opposition. In that role, he was able to secure the defeat, or at least the delay, of Finance bills and other legislation. He agreed to join a Committee with the object of promoting the recruitment of Indian officers into the Indian Army, but this decision contributed to others going further and joining the Government itself.

In March 1926, Nehru demanded a representative conference to draft a constitution conferring full Dominion status on India, to be enacted by the British parliament. This demand was rejected by the Assembly, and as a result Nehru and his colleagues resigned their Assembly seats and returned to the Congress party.

The entry of Motilal's son Jawaharlal Nehru into politics in 1916, started the most powerful and influential Indian political dynasty. When, in 1929, Jawaharlal Nehru was elected as Congress president it greatly pleased Motilal and Nehru family admirers to see the son take over from his father. Jawaharlal had opposed his father's preference for dominion status, and had not left the Congress Party when Motilal helped found the Swaraj Party.

Nehru report
Motilal Nehru chaired the famous Nehru Commission in 1928, a counter to the all-British Simon Commission. The Nehru Report, the first constitution written only by Indians, envisioned a dominion status for India within the Empire, akin to Australia, New Zealand and Canada. It was endorsed by the Indian National Congress, but rejected by more nationalist Indians who sought complete independence. The report was rejected by the Muslim leadership of India, especially Muhammad Ali Jinnah over concerns that the lack of constitutional safeguards against majoritarianism created unacceptable risks for Indian Muslims.

Death and legacy
Motilal Nehru's age and declining health kept him out of the historic events of 1929–1931, when the Congress adopted complete independence as its goal and when Gandhi launched the Salt Satyagraha. He was arrested and imprisoned with his son; but his health gave way and he was released. In the last week of January 1931 Gandhi and the Congress Working Committee were released by the Government as a gesture in that chain of events which was to lead to the Gandhi-lrwin Pact. Motilal had the satisfaction of having his son and Gandhi beside him in his last days. On 6 February 1931 he died.

Motilal Nehru is remembered for being the patriarch of India's most powerful political dynasty which has since produced three Prime Ministers. Two of his great-great-grandsons, Rahul Gandhi, and Varun Gandhi are members of the lower house of Indian parliament, the Lok Sabha and belong to the Indian National Congress and Bharatiya Janata Party respectively.

Tribute

Paying tribute to Motilal Nehru, the British Chief Justice of Allahabad High Court, Sir Grimwood Mears, stated:

Works
 The Voice of Freedom: selected speeches of Pandit Motilal Nehru. ed. Kavalam Madhava Panikkar, A. Pershad. Asia Pub. House, 1961
 Motilal Nehru: essays and reflections on his life and times, by Preet Chablani. S. Chand, 1961.
 Selected Works of Motilal Nehru (Volume 1–6), ed. Ravinder Kumar, D. N. Panigrahi. Vikas Pub., 1995. .

Biographies
 Pandit Motilal Nehru: His life and work, by Upendra Chandra Bhattacharyya, Shovendu Sunder Chakravarty. Modern Book Agency, 1934
 Motilal Nehru: a short political biography, by A. Pershad, Promilla Suri. S. Chand, 1961.
 Motilal Nehru (Builders of modern India), by Bal Ram Nanda. Publications Division, Ministry of Information and Broadcasting, Govt. of India, 1964.
 Pandit Motilal Nehru, a great patriot, with D. C. Goswami, R. K. Nayak, Shankar Dayal Singh. National Forum of Lawyers and Legal Aid, 1976

References

Further reading
 
 Jawaharlal Nehru,  My Autobiography

External links

 

Indian independence activists from Uttar Pradesh
Kashmiri Hindus
Kashmiri Pandits
Kashmiri people
Presidents of the Indian National Congress
1861 births
1931 deaths
Nehru–Gandhi family
People from Agra
Politicians from Allahabad
Members of the Central Legislative Assembly of India
Prisoners and detainees of British India
19th-century Indian lawyers
Uttar Pradesh politicians
Indian newspaper founders
Indian independence activists
Indian barristers
20th-century Indian lawyers
Scholars from Allahabad
People from Allahabad
Businesspeople from Allahabad
Indian Freemasons